LTCS may refer to:
 Lower segment Caesarean section
 Low temperature carbon steel
 Şanlıurfa GAP Airport